"Undercover of the Night" is the lead track and first single from the English rock and roll band the Rolling Stones' 1983 album Undercover.

Inspiration and recording

The song was largely a Mick Jagger composition, with guitarist Keith Richards going as far as saying, "Mick had this one all mapped out, I just played on it". Jagger later said that the song "was heavily influenced by William Burroughs’ ‘Cities of the Red Night,’ a free-wheeling novel about political and sexual repression. It combines a number of different references to what was going down in Argentina and Chile." The song was likely written in Paris in late 1982, where recording began on the album.

In 2003, guitarist Ronnie Wood described the fractious writing as "just me, Mick and Charlie [Watts]... [We] took it up into some wonderful adventures with all these different changes... There was a great percussive and acoustic version, which is the kind of song it should be. The final polished, glossed-up version may have been Mick's vision of the song..."

The lyrics see Jagger explore the then-ongoing political corruption in Central and South America:

"Undercover of the Night" is one of the few songs by the Rolling Stones which overtly explore political ideas. 

Recording began in early 1983 and was resumed later that summer at New York City's famed Hit Factory. There are two versions of this song, one unreleased version featuring usual Rolling Stones bassist Bill Wyman and the released version featuring guest Robbie Shakespeare. The song features Sly Dunbar, Martin Ditcham, Moustapha Cisse and Brahms Coundoul, on various instruments ranging from bongos to timpani. Organ on the piece is performed by Chuck Leavell, who later became the Rolling Stones' regular pianist.

Release
"Undercover of the Night" was released as the first single taken from the album on 1 November 1983. Initial reception was warm with the song reaching number 9 on the US Billboard Hot 100 and number 11 on the UK Singles Chart, though the violent depictions spelled out by Jagger were believed to be why its popularity quickly waned. Jagger in Jump Back'''s liner notes: "I think it's really good but it wasn't particularly successful at the time because songs that deal overtly with politics never are that successful, for some reason." Richards countered: "There were a lot more overlays on this track, because there was a lot more separation in the way we were recording at that time. Mick and I were starting to come to loggerheads."

A music video was made in Mexico City for the song, featuring Jagger as a detective helping a woman (played by Elpidia Carrillo) follow her boyfriend's (also played by Jagger)  kidnappers and Richards as the leader of the kidnappers, who eventually shoots Jagger. The music video, directed by Julien Temple, was considered to be too violent for MTV (they did eventually air an edited version, but not before 9 PM due to the violent imagery).  An uncensored version of the video was included on the band's Video Rewind compilation.

The song has been performed sporadically since its release, most recently on the A Bigger Bang Tour in 2006, and appeared on compilation albums including 2002's Forty Licks and 2012's GRRR!''.

Charts

Weekly charts

Year-end charts

References

1983 singles
Song recordings produced by Chris Kimsey
Song recordings produced by Jagger–Richards
Songs written by Jagger–Richards
Dance-rock songs
The Rolling Stones songs
Music videos directed by Julien Temple
1983 songs